Ruthenia is an exonym, originally used in Medieval Latin as one of several terms for Kievan Rus', the Kingdom of Galicia-Volhynia and, after their collapse, for East Slavic and Eastern Orthodox regions of the Grand Duchy of Lithuania and the Kingdom of Poland, corresponding to what is now Ukraine and Belarus.

During the early modern period, the term Ruthenia started to be mostly associated with the Ruthenian lands of the Polish Crown and the Cossack Hetmanate. Bohdan Khmelnytsky declared himself the ruler of the Ruthenian state to the Polish representative Adam Kysil in February 1649. Grand Principality of Ruthenia was the project name of the Cossack Hetmanate integrated into the Polish–Lithuanian–Ruthenian Commonwealth.

Lands inhabited by Ukrainians (Ruthenians) of the Kingdom of Galicia and Lodomeria (1772–1918), corresponding to parts of Western Ukraine, were referred to as Ruthenia by the Austrian officials. As of now, with Ukrainian national identity dominating over most parts of the former Ruthenia, the Slavic term ("Rusyns") is mostly used among a minority of peoples on the territory Carpathian Mountains in parts of Ukraine, Poland, and Slovakia; and those of the Carpathian Basin in Serbia, and Croatia.

Etymology 

The word Ruthenia originated as a Latin designation of the region whose people originally called themselves the [[Rus (name)|Rus]]. During the Middle Ages, writers in English and other Western European languages applied the term to lands inhabited by Eastern Slavs.
Russia itself was called Great Ruthenia or White Ruthenia until the end of the 17th century.
"Rusia or Ruthenia" appears in the 1520 Latin treatise Mores, leges et ritus omnium gentium, per Ioannem Boëmum, Aubanum, Teutonicum ex multis clarissimis rerum scriptoribus collecti by Johann Boemus. In the chapter De Rusia sive Ruthenia, et recentibus Rusianorum moribus ("About Rus', or Ruthenia, and modern customs of the Rus'"), Boemus tells of a country extending from the Baltic Sea to the Caspian Sea and from the Don River to the northern ocean. It is a source of beeswax, its forests harbor many animals with valuable fur, and the capital city Moscow (Moscovia), named after the Moskva River (Moscum amnem), is 14 miles in circumference.
Danish diplomat Jacob Ulfeldt, who traveled to Russia in 1578 to meet with Tsar Ivan IV, titled his posthumously (1608) published memoir Hodoeporicon Ruthenicum
("Voyage to Ruthenia").

Early Middle Ages

European manuscripts dating from the 11th century used the name Ruthenia to describe Rus', the wider area occupied by the early Rus' (commonly referred to as Kievan Rus). This term was also used to refer to the Slavs of the island of Rügen or to other Baltic Slavs, whom 12th-century chroniclers portrayed as fierce pirate pagans—even though Kievan Rus' had converted to Christianity by the 10th century: Eupraxia, the daughter of Rutenorum rex Vsevolod I of Kiev, had married the Holy Roman Emperor Henry IV in 1089. After the devastating Mongolian occupation of the main part of Ruthenia which began in the 13th century, western Ruthenian principalities became incorporated into the Grand Duchy of Lithuania, after which the state became called the Grand Duchy of Lithuania and Ruthenia.Russia, the Giant that Came Last, Volume 25 The Polish Kingdom also took the title King of Ruthenia when it annexed Galicia. These titles were merged when the Polish–Lithuanian Commonwealth was formed. A small part of Rus' (Transcarpathia, now mainly a part of Zakarpattia Oblast in present-day Ukraine), became subordinated to the Kingdom of Hungary in the 11th century. The Kings of Hungary continued using the title "King of Galicia and Lodomeria" until 1918.

 Late Middle Ages 
By the 15th century, the Moscow principality had established its sovereignty over a large portion of Ruthenian territory and began to fight with Lithuania over the remaining Ruthenian lands.Ivan III Britannica In 1547, the Moscow principality adopted the title of The Great Principat of Moscow and Tsardom of the Whole Rus and claimed sovereignty over "all the Rus'" — acts not recognized by its neighbour Poland. The Muscovy population was Eastern Orthodox and preferred to use the Greek transliteration Rossiya (Ῥωσία) rather than the Latin "Ruthenia".

In the 14th century, the southern territories of Rus', including the principalities of Galicia–Volhynia and Kiev, became part of the Grand Duchy of Lithuania, which in 1384 united with Catholic Poland in a union which became the Polish–Lithuanian Commonwealth in 1569. Due to their usage of the Latin script rather than the Cyrillic script, they were usually denoted by the Latin name Ruthenia. Other spellings were also used in Latin, English, and other languages during this period. Contemporaneously, the Ruthenian Voivodeship was established in the territory of Galicia-Volhynia and existed until the 18th century.

These southern territories include:
 Galicia ( or)
 White Ruthenia, (eastern part of modern Belarus;)
 Black Ruthenia (a western part of modern Belarus)
 Galicia, or Red Ruthenia, western Ukraine and southeast Poland;)
 Carpathian Ruthenia

The Russian Tsardom was officially called Velikoye Knyazhestvo Moskovskoye (Великое Княжество Московское), the Grand Duchy of Moscow, until 1547, although Ivan III (1440–1505) had earlier borne the title "Great Tsar of All Russia".

 Modern Age 

 Ukraine 
The use of the term Rus/Russia in the lands of Rus' survived longer as a name used by Ukrainians for Ukraine. When the Austrian monarchy made the vassal state of Galicia–Lodomeria into a province in 1772, Habsburg officials realized that the local East Slavic people were distinct from both Poles and Russians and still called themselves Rus. This was true until the empire fell in 1918.

In the 1880s through the first decade of the 20th century, the popularity of the ethnonym Ukrainian spread, and the term Ukraine became a substitute for Malaya Rus''' among the Ukrainian population of the empire. In the course of time, the term Rus became restricted to western parts of present-day Ukraine (Galicia/Halych, Carpathian Ruthenia), an area where Ukrainian nationalism competed with Galician Russophilia. By the early 20th century, the term Ukraine had mostly replaced Malorussia in those lands, and by the mid-1920s in the Ukrainian diaspora in North America as well.Rusyn (the Ruthenian) has been an official self-identification of the Rus' population in Poland (and also in Czechoslovakia). Until 1939, for many Ruthenians and Poles, the word Ukrainiec (Ukrainian) meant a person involved in or friendly to a nationalist movement.

 Modern Ruthenia 

After 1918, the name Ruthenia became narrowed to the area south of the Carpathian Mountains in the Kingdom of Hungary, also called Carpathian Ruthenia (including the cities of Mukachevo, Uzhhorod, and Prešov) and populated by Carpatho-Ruthenians, a group of East Slavic highlanders. While Galician Ruthenians considered themselves Ukrainians, the Carpatho-Ruthenians were the last East Slavic people who kept the historical name (Ruthen is a Latin form of the Slavic rusyn). Today, the term Rusyn is used to describe the ethnicity and language of Ruthenians, who are not compelled to adopt the Ukrainian national identity.

Carpathian Ruthenia became part of the newly founded Hungarian Kingdom in 1000. In May 1919, it was incorporated with nominal autonomy into the provisional Czechoslovak state as Subcarpathian Rus. Since then, Ruthenian people have been divided into three orientations: Russophiles, who saw Ruthenians as part of the Russian nation; Ukrainophiles, who like their Galician counterparts across the Carpathian Mountains considered Ruthenians part of the Ukrainian nation; and Ruthenophiles, who claimed that Carpatho-Ruthenians were a separate nation and who wanted to develop a native Rusyn language and culture.

In what in 1938 the French and Spanish press identified as "troublemaking" by the National Socialist government of Germany, there were calls in the German press for the independence of a greater Ukraine, which would include Ruthenia, parts of Hungary, the Polish Southeast including Lviv, the Crimea, and Ukraine, including Kyiv and Kharkiv.

On 15 March 1939, the Ukrainophile president of Carpatho-Ruthenia, Avhustyn Voloshyn, declared its independence as Carpatho-Ukraine. On the same day, regular troops of the Royal Hungarian Army occupied and annexed the region. In 1944 the Soviet Army occupied the territory, and in 1945 it was annexed to the Ukrainian SSR. Rusyns were not an officially recognized ethnic group in the USSR, as the Soviet government considered them to be Ukrainian.

Today, the Ukrainian government and some modern Ukrainian politicians claim that Rusyns are part of the Ukrainian nation. Some of the population in the Zakarpattia Oblast of Ukraine consider themselves Rusyns (Ruthenians), yet they are still a part of the Ukrainian national identity.

A Rusyn minority remained after World War II in eastern Czechoslovakia (now Slovakia). According to critics, the Ruthenians rapidly became Slovakized. In 1995 the Ruthenian written language became standardized.

Ruthenium
The Baltic German naturalist and chemist Karl Ernst Claus, member of the Russian Academy of Science, was born in 1796 in Dorpat (Tartu), then in the Governorate of Livonia of the Russian Empire, now in Estonia. In 1844, he isolated the element ruthenium from platinum ore found in the Ural Mountains and named it after Ruthenia, which was meant to be the Latin name for Russia.

See also
 Lemkos
 Ruthenian (disambiguation)
 Ruthenian nobility

Notes

 References 

 Sources 
 Norman Davies, Europe: A History. New York, Oxford University Press, 1996. 
 
 

 External links 

 
 Why is the "Russia" White? - a book review of Ales Biely's Chronicle of Ruthenia Alba''
 "Ruthenia – Spearhead Toward the West", by Senator Charles J. Hokky, Former Member of the Czechoslovakian Parliament (Book representing a Hungarian nationalist position)